Rochea is the name of two genera of plants and may refer to:
 Rochea Scopoli 1777, a synonym of Aeschynomene.
 Rochea DC. 1802, a synonym of Crassula.